Ambrosius Capello (1597–1676) was the seventh bishop of Antwerp (1654–1676).

Life
Capello was born in Antwerp on 22 June 1597, the son of an Italian military contractor, Jean-François Capello, and a Netherlandish lady, Marie de Boxhorn. He entered the Dominican Order in 1612 and studied Theology in the universities of Douai, Salamanca and Leuven. He obtained the degree of Doctor of Theology in Leuven in 1627.

He held a number of positions of responsibility in his order – prior of several houses, definitor for the Belgian province, deputy of the province to the general chapter – and in 1642 he was named vice-prefect of the Dutch Mission. In 1652 he was named bishop of Antwerp, but the appointment was not confirmed until 1654. On 13 September 1654, he was consecrated bishop by his predecessor, Gaspard Nemius, who had been transferred to the archdiocese of Cambrai. As bishop, he founded a number of scholarships and a retirement home for aged priests.

Capello died in Antwerp on 4 October 1676, leaving all his worldly goods to the poor. His ornate Baroque tomb in Antwerp Cathedral, designed by Artus Quellinus II, was the only one to survive the French Revolution.

References

External links

1597 births
1676 deaths
17th-century Roman Catholic bishops in the Holy Roman Empire
Belgian Dominicans
Dominican bishops
Bishops of Antwerp
University of Douai alumni
University of Salamanca alumni